Willoughby is a masculine given name which may refer to:

 Willoughby Aston (disambiguation), three Aston baronets
 Willoughby J. Edbrooke (1843–1896), American architect
 Willoughby Gray (1916–1993), English actor
 Willoughby Hamilton (1864–1943), Irish tennis, football and badminton player
 Willoughby D. Miller (1853–1907), American dentist and the first oral microbiologist
 Willoughby Norrie, 1st Baron Norrie (1893–1977), British Army lieutenant-general, Governor of South Australia and Governor-General of New Zealand
 Willoughby Sharp (1936–2008), American artist, independent curator, independent publisher, gallerist, teacher, and author
 Willoughby Shortland (1804–1869), British naval officer and colonial administrator, first Colonial Secretary of New Zealand, President of the island of Nevis, and Governor of Tobago
 Willoughby Smith (1828–1891), English electrical engineer who discovered the photoconductivity of selenium
 Willoughby Williams (died 1802), American politician, father of Willoughby Williams Jr.
 Willoughby Williams Jr. (1798-1882), American banker and sheriff

English-language masculine given names